Jessica Lucetta Léone Houara-d'Hommeaux (née Houara) (born 29 September 1987) is a former French football player who played as a midfielder for Paris Saint-Germain, Olympique Lyon and other French clubs, and for the French national team.

Career

She made her debut for the France national  team having on 8 March 2008 in a friendly match against Morocco.

Career statistics
Correct as of 8 June 2015

International goals

Honours

Club
Paris Saint-Germain
Coupe de France Féminine: Winner 2010

National Team

SheBelieves Cup: Winner 2017

References

External links

 PSG player profile
 
 

1987 births
Living people
French women's footballers
CNFE Clairefontaine players
AS Saint-Étienne (women) players
Paris Saint-Germain Féminine players
Olympique Lyonnais Féminin players
Sportspeople from Angers
France women's youth international footballers
France women's international footballers
Women's association football midfielders
2015 FIFA Women's World Cup players
French sportspeople of Algerian descent
Footballers at the 2016 Summer Olympics
Olympic footballers of France
Division 1 Féminine players
Footballers from Pays de la Loire
UEFA Women's Euro 2017 players